The Medi Teddy is a teddy bear sleeve that hides an IV bag from the patient. It was developed in 2019 by 12 year old Idiopathic Thrombocytopenia Purpura (ITP) patient Ella Casano whose treatment included an IV transfusion every six to eight weeks. With the product, the child only sees a teddy bear; on the other side (made of mesh), medical staff get to monitor blood IV fluid movements. TODAY honored her as a Groundbreaker for International Day of the Girl. The Medi Teddy set out to arrange $5,000 on a GoFundMe page but within less than a week raised over $20,000. The bears are given to children in need at no cost. Ella described to her mother Meg Casano what the design should look like and her mother drew it for her.

References

Children's health